Ralph Perretta (born 	January 30, 1953) is a former professional American football player who played offensive lineman for six seasons for the San Diego Chargers and New York Giants.
He was an All State selection in high school while attending Holy Trinity on Long Island, NY. While at Purdue he was a 3-year starter and co captain for the Boilermakers. He was drafted by the San Diego Chargers and started at center.

References

1953 births
Living people
American football offensive linemen
New York Giants players
Purdue Boilermakers football players
San Diego Chargers players
People from Rockville Centre, New York
Sportspeople from Nassau County, New York
Players of American football from New York (state)